Alexander Alexandrovich Evtushenko (born 30 June 1993) is a Russian professional racing cyclist, who last rode for UCI Continental team , despite news that he would join  for the 2021 season. He rode at the 2015 UCI Track Cycling World Championships.

Major results

2013
 1st  Time trial, National Under-23 Road Championships
 10th Chrono Champenois
2014
 1st  Time trial, National Under-23 Road Championships
 1st Stage 3 (ITT) Grand Prix of Sochi
 2nd  Individual pursuit, UEC European Track Championships
 2nd  Team pursuit, UEC European Under-23 Track Championships
 3rd  Time trial, UEC European Under-23 Road Championships
2015
 1st  Time trial, National Under-23 Road Championships
2017
 National Track Championships
1st  Individual pursuit
1st  Team pursuit
2nd  Points race
 1st Stage 1 Vuelta a Castilla y León
 2nd Overall GP Beiras e Serra da Estrela
1st Stage 1
 3rd  Team pursuit, UEC European Track Championships
2018
 National Track Championships
1st  Individual pursuit
1st  Team pursuit
 1st Giro del Medio Brenta
 1st  Mountains classification Volta ao Alentejo
 3rd  Individual pursuit, UCI Track World Championships
 8th Klasika Primavera
 8th Gran Premio FECOCI
2019
 1st  Individual pursuit, National Track Championships
2020
 1st  Team pursuit, UEC European Track Championships
2021 
 1st Prologue Five Rings of Moscow

References

External links
 

1993 births
Living people
Russian male cyclists
Russian track cyclists
People from Maykop
Sportspeople from Adygea